Bradinopyga strachani, the red rockdweller or red rock-dweller,  is a species of dragonfly in the family Libellulidae. It is native to much of West, Central, and East Africa. It can be found around rock pools. It has been observed resting on the steep sides of termite mounds.

References

Libellulidae
Odonata of Africa
Taxa named by William Forsell Kirby
Insects described in 1900
Taxonomy articles created by Polbot